Coomb is an alternate spelling of combe.

It may also refer to:
Arthur Coomb (born 1929), English cricketer
Coomb (unit), a unit of measure by volume.
Coombs test, an aid to medical diagnosis.

See also
Deeping Coomb, a fictional deep valley in The Lord of the Rings.
Coombe (disambiguation)
Combe (disambiguation)
Cwm (disambiguation)